Boniva may refer to:

 Boniva, a company acquired by software company SSA Global Technologies in August 2005
 Ibandronic acid (marketed as Boniva), a potent bisphosphonate drug used in the prevention and treatment of osteoporosis